WJZY (channel 46) is a television station licensed to Belmont, North Carolina, United States, serving as the Fox affiliate for the Charlotte area. It is owned by Nexstar Media Group alongside Rock Hill, South Carolina–licensed MyNetworkTV affiliate WMYT-TV (channel 55). WJZY and WMYT-TV share studios on Performance Road (along I-85) in unincorporated western Mecklenburg County (with a Charlotte mailing address); through a channel sharing agreement, the two stations transmit using WJZY's spectrum from an antenna in Dallas, North Carolina, along the Catawba River.

WJZY was originally established in 1987 by a Charlotte group that included Harvey Gantt, the city's mayor. Soon after, that group sold the station, and channel 46 operated for the next 25 years as an independent station, then a UPN and CW affiliate, until it was purchased by Fox Television Stations in 2013, resulting in the station switching affiliations to Fox and the establishment of a new news service.

History

Early history
Two of the nine competing applicants for the channel 46 frequency in Belmont merged as Metro–Crescent Communications in 1985 and won the construction permit by settling with the other contenders. Metro–Crescent's shareholders included two executives of Suburban Radio Group (then-owner of WPEG), Bob Hilker and Bill Rollins; Charlotte mayor Harvey Gantt; dentist Spurgeon Webber; and Winston-Salem attorney David Wagner. Originally, the station received the call letters WHMU, but changes came even before it went on the air. Capitol Broadcasting Company of Raleigh reached a deal to buy a 49 percent stake in Metro-Crescent with an option to purchase the remainder later in February 1986; to do so, it had to divest itself of two Charlotte-market radio stations. The sale stood to make the partners, including Gantt, about $3 million; Gantt later admitted to the Charlotte city council that he had violated city ethics policy in failing to disclose his stake in the firm. Before the station even went on the air, the call letters were changed to WJZY in November 1986 in order to differentiate from other Charlotte television stations, none of which had a "J" or "Z" in their call signs.

WJZY, originally an independent station, made its first broadcast on March 9, 1987. Channel 46 pushed up its launch to aid cable companies who dropped out-of-town stations to carry it. In Charlotte itself, for example, it replaced Washington, D.C.'s WDCA on Cablevision (later Time Warner Cable, now Charter Spectrum) on cable channel 8. It initially only aired a schedule of older movies in evening hours only. It began full commercial operations in July, airing a general entertainment format of off-network and first-run syndicated shows, movies, and cartoons. It was the first full-market Charlotte station since WCTU-TV (channel 36, now WCNC-TV) launched in July 1967 (WHKY-TV [channel 14] in Hickory had signed on in 1968, but mostly targeted the northwestern portion of the market).

Capitol exercised its option to buy the remainder of WJZY later that summer; a group petitioned against the sale, claiming Metro–Crescent had reneged on its promises for local programming, but the challenges were dropped, and the sale was approved by the Federal Communications Commission (FCC) in November. By that time, however, Gantt's stake had been an issue in his run for re-election; he lost in a close race to Sue Myrick and admitted that her statements on Metro–Crescent may have swung the race for her.

Under Capitol, the station grew. In 1988, it was speculated that NBC might move to WJZY from channel 36 at a time when the network was actively courting other stations to upgrade in the market and the incumbent station had a weaker signal; NBC was reported to also covet Capitol's other broadcast property, WRAL-TV, then the CBS affiliate in Raleigh. Though this change did not occur, by 1990, channel 46 was even with WCCB (channel 18), the Fox affiliate, in key dayparts. The station's rapid growth came at a time when the Charlotte market had become large enough to support what were essentially two full-market independent stations (WCCB, like most early Fox affiliates, was programmed largely as an independent until 1995).

WJZY owned a large amount of syndicated programming, but did not have nearly enough time in its broadcast day to air all of it. A solution came with the sign-on of WFVT (channel 55, later WWWB and now WMYT-TV) in September 1994. Capitol Broadcasting entered into a local marketing agreement (LMA) with WFVT's Indiana-based owner, Family 55. Under this LMA, WJZY bought WFVT's entire broadcast day and placed much of this extra programming on WFVT.

UPN and CW affiliation
The station became a charter affiliate of the United Paramount Network (UPN) when the network launched on January 16, 1995. WFVT joined The WB at the same time, creating one of the first UPN/WB partnerships in the country. For most of UPN's run, WJZY was one of the network's strongest affiliates, and by 2006, it was tied with UPN's Atlanta owned-and-operated station WUPA as the network's fifth highest-rated station.

WJZY served as the over-the-air home of NBA's Charlotte Hornets from 1992 to 1998, during the height of the team's popularity; the last two seasons were shared with WFVT. When the Hornets returned as the Charlotte Bobcats in 2004, WJZY served as the team's over-the-air flagship until the telecasts moved to WMYT in 2006.

On January 24, 2006, Time Warner and CBS Corporation announced that they would shut down The WB and UPN that fall. In place of these networks, the two companies would form The CW, a new network combining the most popular programs from both UPN and The WB with new series produced specifically for the network. On March 1, the Capitol Broadcasting Company announced that WJZY would become the Charlotte area affiliate of The CW, making it one of the first five stations outside of the core Tribune Company and CBS Television Stations groups to agree to carry the new network. WJZY affiliated with The CW upon the network's debut on September 18, 2006. Later that week, channel 55 signed with MyNetworkTV.

Sale to Fox Television Stations and switch to Fox

On January 14, 2013, Fox Television Stations entered into an agreement to acquire WJZY and WMYT from Capitol Broadcasting for $18 million (the sale was formally announced on January 28). Although Charlotte's longtime Fox affiliate, WCCB, had been one of the network's strongest performers, Fox had been interested in buying a station in a steadily growing market. According to Fox Television Stations president Jack Abernethy, another factor was that Charlotte was home to the Carolina Panthers, a National Football Conference team whose games air primarily on Fox; Abernethy said that Fox had set its sights on getting an owned and operated station in Charlotte specifically because it was an NFC market.

Another likely factor in the purchase was an option that Fox held to purchase WLFL and WRDC in the Raleigh–Durham market from Sinclair Broadcast Group; had Fox exercised the option, it would have jeopardized the affiliation of another Capitol station, WRAZ in that market. The deal included a time brokerage agreement clause that would have had Fox take over the operations of WJZY and WMYT and acquire the duopoly's non-license assets for $8.24 million if the deal was not closed by June 1. The FCC granted its approval of the sale on March 11, and the deal was consummated on April 17. By June, WJZY had dropped all references to The CW from its branding, adopting the interim brand of "WJZY 46."

On April 18, WCCB announced that it would become the new CW affiliate for the Charlotte market on July 1, the date its Fox affiliation contract ended. On that date, WJZY would become the new Fox outlet for the Charlotte market, adopting the on-air brand "Fox 46 Carolinas" at that time.

Sale to Nexstar Media Group
On November 5, 2019, Fox Corporation announced that WJZY and WMYT-TV would be acquired by Nexstar Media Group for $45 million in a deal concurrent with Fox's purchase of KCPQ and KZJO in Seattle and repurchase of WITI in Milwaukee, Wisconsin, from Nexstar. Nexstar stated that WJZY and WMYT were "geographically complementary" to its existing properties in the Southeastern United States. The sale was completed on March 2, 2020.

In late 2021, the station began slowly rebranding itself as "Fox Charlotte"–a moniker used by WCCB in its latter years as a Fox affiliate. It fully rebranded as "Fox Charlotte" in January 2022.

News operation

News share agreements
From May 1994 to June 1995 and again from September 2003 to April 8, 2012, CBS affiliate WBTV produced a nightly 10:00 p.m. newscast for WJZY through separate news share agreements. The 1990s attempt was replaced by a five-year deal between WBTV and PBS member station WTVI (channel 42). The second iteration was placing third behind 10 p.m. newscasts aired by WCCB and WAXN-TV (from WSOC-TV); the low ratings for the program on WJZY and a more "news-friendly audience" on its sister station were cited as the reason for its move to WJZY's duopoly partner WMYT on April 9, 2012. It was simulcast by both stations for one week, before syndicated reruns of Law & Order: Criminal Intent replaced the simulcast on WJZY on April 16, 2012.

WJZY also aired the statewide weekly public affairs program NC Spin and produced a local public affairs show called Charlotte Now with Mike Collins, which was discontinued following its June 30, 2013, edition, one day before the official switch to Fox.

Building a newsroom
With Fox's purchase of the WJZY/WMYT duopoly, Fox built a standalone news department for WJZY. In the meantime, WBTV's 10:00 p.m. production returned to WJZY from WMYT when channel 46 officially joined Fox on July 1, 2013. While initial reports suggested that Fox would move WJZY/WMYT to a facility in Charlotte's University City section used by Fox Sports 1 and previously by Speed, it was instead decided to heavily renovate and expand the Performance Road studio to accommodate the news department. WJZY soft-launched its news operation on December 18, 2013, in the form of live webcasts nightly through year's end airing concurrently with the WBTV-produced 10:00 p.m. news on channel 46.

WJZY's local news service on January 1, 2014, with the debut of a nightly hour-long 10:00 p.m. newscast titled MyFox Carolinas Primetime. The newscast adopted an alternative format designed to target younger viewers, carrying characteristics of but being more traditional than the similarly unconventional public affairs program Chasing News from MyNetworkTV flagship WWOR-TV in Secaucus, New Jersey; however, while Chasing was patterned off the format of TMZ, WJZY's newscast still contained some conventional traits. Jack Abernethy, the head of Fox Television Stations felt that "when you're not being held by an existing show, it's much easier to do things differently". The program roamed the newsroom throughout the hour in a more "casual" style but traditional reporting; stories were introduced by anchor Cheryl Brayboy from reporters' desks or elsewhere in the newsroom, and weather reports were done from a large display near the center of the room. The differences in the operation were also reflected in differing job titles: former news director Roth's formal title was "vice president of local content" and the reporters were called "digital journalists", with lead anchor Brayboy (and later Barbara Lash) referred to as a "senior digital journalist". WJZY also operated five bureaus in Charlotte's outer suburbs staffed by reporters living in those communities to bolster its regional emphasis.

WJZY expanded its news operation on June 30, 2014, with the introduction of the hour-long evening newscast MyFox Carolinas Live, followed by the August 25, 2014, introduction of the station's morning show, Good Day Carolinas, described as having "more of a sofa-and-coffee-table production" than its competitors. Despite having the highly-viewed Fox primetime lineup as its lead-in, the station continued to lose viewers at 10:00 p.m. to WAXN and WCCB, while the station's morning news was in fifth place among Charlotte stations and airings of The People's Court on sister station WMYT had slightly better ratings than WJZY's evening news. Additionally, the newscast was viewed as being somewhat amateurish due to inexperienced reporters and technical problems and the length of the hour-long format. By June 2015, WJZY had begun shifting back towards a traditional format; Mark Washburn of The Charlotte Observer explained that "after aiming to re-engineer local news, Fox 46 has retreated to the formula it once mocked: chasing fire trucks and standard urban crime". On December 21, 2021, the station announced it would change its news brand to Queen City News (with the slogan "Carolinas' Own"), which took effect on January 10, 2022. The move came after Nexstar concluded that WJZY had no real brand, with viewers often confusing it with Fox News Channel.

Nick Kosir worked for WJZY for seven years and was the WJZY morning meteorologist. He was best known for humorous Instagram photos and later for dance videos. He had over 2 million followers on social media when he announced in April 2021 that he was leaving WJZY and moving to Fox Weather.

Technical information

Subchannels
The station's digital signal is multiplexed:

Also on the WJZY multiplex is WMYT-TV's lone subchannel (55.1); Fox Television Stations sold off WMYT's spectrum in the 2016 FCC spectrum auction.

Analog-to-digital conversion
WJZY shut down its analog signal, over UHF channel 46, on June 12, 2009, the official date in which full-power television stations in the United States transitioned from analog to digital broadcasts under federal mandate. The station's digital signal remained on its pre-transition UHF channel 47.

As part of the SAFER Act, WJZY kept its analog signal on the air in the immediate aftermath of the switch to inform viewers of the digital television transition through a loop of public service announcements from the National Association of Broadcasters.

ATSC 3.0
WJZY debuted on Charlotte's new ATSC 3.0 (NextGen TV) service, hosted by WAXN-TV, on July 7, 2021.

References

External links
 

Fox network affiliates
Charge! (TV network) affiliates
Grit (TV network) affiliates
Heroes & Icons affiliates
Ion Television affiliates
TheGrio affiliates
Rewind TV affiliates
Nexstar Media Group
Television channels and stations established in 1987
1987 establishments in North Carolina
JZY